William Selman was an English politician who was MP for Plympton Erle in 1420, May 1421, December 1421, 1425, and 1429. His wife Joan Beauchamp may have been the mother of Robert Chalons.

References

English MPs 1420
English MPs May 1421
English MPs December 1421
English MPs 1425
English MPs 1429
Members of the Parliament of England for Plympton Erle